Six vessels of the Royal Navy have been named HMS Expedition:
  was a 20-gun French ship captured in 1618 and last listed in 1652
  was a 30-gun ship launched in 1637 and sold in 1667
  was a 70-gun ship of the line launched in 1679. She was renamed Prince Frederick in 1715 and sold in 1784
  was a 44-gun frigate launched in 1747 and broken up in 1764
  was a 14-gun cutter launched in 1778 and listed until 1801
  was a 44-gun frigate launched in 1784. She became a 26-gun troopship in 1798 and was broken up in 1817

References

 

Royal Navy ship names